Cazzago Brabbia is a comune in the province of Varese, in Lombardy.

References